The 362d Tactical Electronic Warfare Squadron is an inactive United States Air Force unit. It was last assigned to the 6498th Air Base Wing at Da Nang Air Base, Republic of Vietnam. It was inactivated on 28 February 1973.

The squadron served during World War II as the 462d Bombardment Squadron.  It did not see combat, arriving in the Pacific only a few days before VJ Day

History

World War II

Heavy bomber replacement training
The 462d Bombardment Squadron was first activated in July 1942 at Salt Lake City Army Air Base, Utah as one of the original squadrons of the 331st Bombardment Group.  In September it moved to Casper Army Air Field, where it conducted Boeing B-17 Flying Fortress replacement training until 1943, when it converted to the Consolidated B-24 Liberator.  Replacement training units were oversized units which trained aircrews prior to their deployment to combat theaters. However, the Army Air Forces found that standard military units, based on relatively inflexible tables of organization, were not proving to be well adapted to the training mission.  Accordingly, it adopted a more functional system in which each base was organized into a separate numbered unit, while the groups and squadrons acting as replacement training units were disbanded or inactivated. This resulted in the 462d, along with other units at Casper, being inactivated in the spring of 1944 and being replaced by the 211th AAF Base Unit (Combat Crew Training Station, Heavy), which assumed the 331st Group's mission, personnel, and equipment.

Very heavy bomber operations
In August 1944, the squadron was reactivated as a Boeing B-29 Superfortress unit at Dalhart Army Air Field, Texas and assigned to the 346th Bombardment Group.  It trained with Superfortresses at Dalhart and Pratt Army Air Field, Kansas until June 1945, when it began moving to Okinawa to become part of Eighth Air Force.  Although the war ended before the squadron could begin operations, a few of its crews formed part of its forward echelon and flew missions with B-29 units of Twentieth Air Force.

The squadron flew several show of force missions from Okinawa over Japan following VJ Day.  It also evacuated prisoners of war from camps in Japan to the Philippines.  The squadron was inactivated on Okinawa in June 1946.

Vietnam War
The squadron was activated in South Vietnam in 1967.  It flew C-47 aircraft equipped with electronic countermeasures equipment over South Vietnam. It was made inactive as part of United States drawdown in Southeast Asia during 1973.

Lineage
 462d Bombardment Squadron
 Constituted as the 462d Bombardment Squadron (Heavy) on 1 July 1942
 Activated on 6 July 1942
 Inactivated on 1 April 1944
 Redesignated 462d Bombardment Squadron, Very Heavy on 4 August 1944
 Activated on 18 August 1944
 Inactivated on 30 June 1946
 Consolidated with the 362d Tactical Electronic Warfare Squadron as the 362d Tactical Electronic Warfare Squadron on 19 September 1985

 362d Tactical Electronic Warfare Squadron
 Constituted as the 362d Reconnaissance Squadron and activated
 Organized on 1 February 1967
 Redesignated 362d Tactical Electronic Warfare Squadron on 15 March 1967
 Inactivated on 28 February 1973
 Consolidated with the 462d Bombardment Squadron on 19 September 1985

Assignments
 331st Bombardment Group, 6 July 1942 – 1 April 1944
 346th Bombardment Group, 18 August 1944 – 30 June 1946
 Pacific Air Forces (not organized)
 460th Tactical Reconnaissance Wing, 1 February 1967
 483d Tactical Airlift Wing, 31 August 1971
 366th Tactical Fighter Wing, 1 February 1972
 6498th Air Base Wing, 27 June 1972 – 28 February 1973

Stations
 Salt Lake City Army Air Base, Utah, 6 July 1942
 Casper Army Air Field, Wyoming, 15 September 1942 – 1 April 1944
 Dalhart Army Air Field, Texas, 18 August 1944
 Pratt Army Air Field, Kansas, 12 December 1944 – 29 June 1945
 Kadena Airfield, Okinawa, 13 August 1945 – 30 June 1946
 Pleiku Air Base, Republic of Vietnam, 1 February 1967
 Phan Rang Air Base, Republic of Vietnam, June 1969
 Da Nang Air Base, Republic of Vietnam, 1 February 1972 – 28 February 1973

Aircraft

 Boeing B-17 Flying Fortress, 1942–1943, 1945
 Consolidated B-24 Liberator, 1943–1944
 Boeing B-29 Superfortress, 1945–1946
 Curtiss C-46 Commando, 1946
 Douglas C-47 Skytrain
 Douglas EC-47H Skytrain

References

Notes
 Explanatory notes

 Citations

Bibliography

 
 
 
 
 

Electronic warfare squadrons of the United States Air Force